Carlos Alberto da Costa Neves Airport  is the airport serving Caçador, Brazil.

Airlines and destinations

No scheduled flights operate at this airport.

Access

See also

List of airports in Brazil

References

External links

Airports in Santa Catarina (state)